D40 may refer to:
 Akaflieg Darmstadt D-40, a German sailplane
 D40 Navara, a Nissan pickup truck
 D40 road (Croatia)
 Dupuy D-40, a French monoplane
 , a Ruler-class escort carrier of the Royal Navy
 LNER Class D40, a class of British steam locomotives
 New Flyer D40, a Canadian bus
 Nikon D40, a digital camera